Boxing at the 8th All Africa Games was held in Abuja, Nigeria from October 4-13, 2003. It served as a qualification tournament for the 2004 Summer Olympics in Athens, Greece. The number one and two earned a ticket for the Olympic tournament.

A total number of 182 fighters from 27 countries did participate in Abuja, Nigeria, with the host country (four gold, three silver, no bronze) as the overall-winner before Egypt (three gold, two silver, two bronze) and Algeria (two gold, one silver, four bronze).  All the finalists got quotes for the 2004 Summer Olympics.  Two more qualification tournaments followed afterwards on the African continent: in Casablanca, Morocco (January 15 to January 22, 2004) and in Gaborone, Botswana (March 15 to March 22, 2004).

Medal winners

See also
2003 African Amateur Boxing Championships
Boxing at the 2004 Summer Olympics

External links
Results
Amateur Boxing

Boxing at the African Games
A
2003 All-Africa Games